Kayapa is a village in the Büyükorhan district of Bursa Province in Turkey.

References

Villages in Büyükorhan District